Spelman College is a private, historically black, women's liberal arts college in Atlanta, Georgia. It is part of the Atlanta University Center academic consortium in Atlanta. Founded in 1881 as the Atlanta Baptist Female Seminary, Spelman received its collegiate charter in 1924, making it America's second oldest private historically black liberal arts college for women.

History

Founding 

Giles and Packard had met while Giles was a student, and Packard the preceptress, of the New Salem Academy in New Salem, Massachusetts, and fostered a lifelong friendship there. The two of them traveled to Atlanta specifically to found a school for black freedwomen, and found support from Frank Quarles, the pastor of Friendship Baptist Church.

Giles and Packard began the school with 11 African-American women and $100 given to them by the First Baptist Church in Medford, Massachusetts, and a promise of further support from the Woman's American Baptist Home Mission Society (WABHMS), a group with which they were both affiliated in Boston.  Although their first students were mostly illiterate, they envisioned their school to be a liberal arts institution – the first circular of the college stated that they planned to offer "algebra, physiology, essays, Latin, rhetoric, geometry, political economy, mental philosophy (psychology), chemistry, botany, Constitution  of  the United  States, astronomy, zoology, geology, moral philosophy, and evidences  of Christianity".  Over time, they attracted more students; by the time the first term ended, they had enrolled 80 students in the seminary.  The WABHMS made a down payment on a nine-acre (36,000 m2) site in Atlanta relatively close to the church they began in, which originally had five buildings left from a Union Civil War encampment, to support classroom and residence hall needs.

In 1882 the two women returned to Massachusetts to bid for more money and were introduced to wealthy Northern Baptist businessman John D. Rockefeller at a church conference in Ohio.  Rockefeller was impressed by Packard's vision.  In April 1884, Rockefeller visited the school.  By this time, the seminary had 600 students and 16 faculty members.  It was surviving on generous donations by the black community in Atlanta, the efforts of volunteer teachers, and gifts of supplies; many Atlanta black churches, philanthropists, and black community groups raised and donated money to settle the debt on the property that had been acquired. Rockefeller was so impressed that he settled the debt on the property.  Rockefeller's wife, Laura Spelman Rockefeller; her sister, Lucy Spelman; and their parents, Harvey Buel and Lucy Henry Spelman, were also supportive of the school.  The Spelmans were longtime activists in the abolitionist movement.  In 1884 the name of the school was changed to the Spelman Seminary in honor of Laura Spelman and her parents. Rockefeller also donated the funds for what is currently the oldest building on campus, Rockefeller Hall, which was constructed in 1886.

Packard was appointed as Spelman's first president in 1888, after the charter for the seminary was granted. Packard died in 1891, and Giles assumed the presidency until her death in 1909.

Growth 

The years 1910 to 1953 saw great growth and transition for the seminary. Upon Giles' death, Lucy Hale Tapley became president. Although the college was a stride in and of itself, at the time, neither the founders nor the current administration had interest in challenging the status quo of young women as primarily responsible for the family and the home. Tapley declared: "Any course of study which fails to cultivate a taste and fitness for practical and efficient work in some part of the field of the world's needs is unpopular at Spelman and finds no place in our curriculum." The nursing curriculum was strengthened; a teachers' dormitory and a home economics building were constructed, and Tapley Hall, the science building, was completed in 1925. The Granddaughters' Club, a club for students whose mothers and aunts had attended Spelman was also created, and this club is still in existence today.

In September 1924, Spelman Baptist Seminary officially became Spelman College. Florence Matilda Read assumed the presidency in 1927. Shortly thereafter, Spelman entered into an "agreement of affiliation" with nearby Morehouse College and Atlanta University by chartering the Atlanta University Center in 1929. Atlanta University was to provide graduate education for students, whereas Morehouse and Spelman were responsible for the undergraduate education. At a time during which black students were often denied access to graduate studies at predominantly white southern research universities, access to Atlanta University allowed the undergraduate students at Morehouse and Spelman immediate access to graduate training.

In 1927, one of the most important buildings on campus, Sisters Chapel, was dedicated. The chapel was named for its primary benefactors, sisters Laura Spelman Rockefeller and Lucy Maria Spelman. The college had also begun to see an improvement in extracurricular investment in the arts, with the organization of the Spelman College Glee Club in 1925, inauguration of the much-loved Atlanta tradition of the annual Spelman-Morehouse Christmas Carol Concert and smaller events such as the spring orchestra and chorus concert, the Atlanta University Summer Theater, and the University Players, a drama organization for AUC students. The school also began to see more of a focus on collegiate education, as it discontinued its elementary and high school divisions. In 1930 the Spelman Nursery School was created as a training center for mothers and a practice arena for students who planned careers in education and child development. Spelman celebrated its 50th anniversary in April 1931. This milestone as accompanied by the construction of a university library that was shared amongst the Atlanta University Center institutions, and the center continues to share a library to this day.

The school continued to expand, building and acquiring more property to accommodate the growing student body. IN 1947, Spelman joined the list of "approved institutions" of the Association of American Universities. In 1953, Florence Read retired, and Albert E. Manley became the first black and first male president of college. Under his presidency and the presidency of his successor, Donald Stewart, Spelman saw significant growth. The college established its study abroad program, the Merrill Foreign Travel-Study Program. Stewart's administration tripled the college's endowment and oversaw the establishment of the Comprehensive Writing Program, an across-the-curriculum writing program that requires students to submit portfolios of their written work; the Ethel Waddell Githii College Honors Program; and the Women's Research and Resource Center. In 1958, the college received accreditation from the Southern Association of Colleges and Schools.

Civil rights involvement 
Going into the 1960s, the Spelman College students became involved in civil rights actions in Atlanta. In 1962, the first Spelman students were arrested for participating in sit-ins in the Atlanta community. Noted American historian Howard Zinn was a professor of history at Spelman during this era, and served as an adviser to the Student Nonviolent Coordinating Committee chapter at the college. Zinn mentored many of Spelman's students fighting for civil rights at the time, including Alice Walker and Marian Wright Edelman Zinn was dismissed from the college in 1963 for supporting Spelman students in their efforts to fight segregation; at the time, Spelman was focused on turning out "refined young ladies." Edelman herself writes that Spelman had a reputation as "a tea-pouring, very strict school designed to turn black girls into refined ladies and teachers."

1980–present 
Stewart retired in 1986, and the following year, Johnnetta Betsch Cole became the first Black female president of Spelman College.  During this time, the college became noted for its commitment to community service and its ties to the local community.  Cole also led the college's most successful capital campaign; between 1986 and 1996, the college raised $113.8 million, including a $20 million gift from Bill Cosby and his wife, Camille Hanks Cosby, whose daughter graduated from Spelman. In honor of this gift, the Cosby Academic Center was constructed. In July 2015, the remainder of the funds were returned and an endowed professorship named for the Cosby couple discontinued as allegations of sexual assault by Bill Cosby grew more prominent.

In 1997, Cole stepped down and Audrey Forbes Manley became Spelman's first alumna president. After her retirement, in 2002, Beverly Daniel Tatum, the college's president until 2015, took the post.

In 2011, First Lady Michelle Obama served as the keynote commencement speaker. The following year, Oprah Winfrey served as the keynote commencement speaker.

In 2015, Spelman opened the Wellness Center at Reed Hall, a state-of-the-art recreation center. It is host to a multitude of services from an indoor track and cycling room to a teaching kitchen and a multitude of fitness and wellness programs.  Also in 2015, Mary Schmidt Campbell was named the tenth president of Spelman College.

In 2017, Spelman's leadership voted to allow transgender women to enroll in the institution.

In 2018, Spelman received $30 million from Spelman trustee Ronda Stryker for the construction of a new state-of-the-art building on campus. Stryker's gift is one of the largest single donations from a living donor in Spelman's history. Two years later, the college received another significant donation: $40 million from philanthropists Reed Hastings and his wife Patty Quillin to be used as scholarship funds for students enrolled at Spelman. Their donation is one of the largest in the history of Spelman and HBCUs. In July 2020, Spelman received a notably large undisclosed donation from philanthropist MacKenzie Scott.

In April 2022, Helene Gayle was named the 11th president of Spelman College.

Presidents 

Since its inception Spelman has had 11 presidents:

 Sophia B. Packard, (1888) founded women's seminary with Giles in a basement of the historic Friendship Baptist Church (Atlanta) and cultivated Rockefeller support for the school
 Harriet E. Giles, (1891) under whom the school granted its first college degrees
 Lucy Hale Tapley, (1910) under whom the school decided to focus on higher education, the school officially became Spelman College (1927), and Sisters Chapel, one of the main buildings on campus, was erected
 Florence M. Read, (1927) under whom the school established an endowment fund of over $3 million, the school came into agreement with Atlanta University and Morehouse College to form the Atlanta University Center (later Clark-Atlanta University, Morris Brown College, Morehouse School of Medicine, and the Interdenominational Theological Center were added), the Arnett Library was built, and Spelman earned approval from the American Association of Universities
 Albert E. Manley (1953) (the first black and first male president of Spelman), under whom study abroad programs were established, the fine arts center was built, and three new residence halls and several classroom buildings were renovated. According to Howard Zinn, Manley tried to suppress the student civil rights movement that was taking place on campus during his tenure
 Donald M. Stewart (1976) under whom the departments of women's studies and chemistry were founded, and three strategic programs were formed: the Comprehensive Writing Program, the Women's Research and Resource Center, and the Ethel Waddell Githii Honors Program, and a continuing education department and a computer literacy program were established
 Johnnetta B. Cole (1987) (the first African-American woman president of Spelman), under whom the college received $20 million from Drs. William and Camille Cosby for the construction of the Cosby Academic Center and instituted the Cole Institute for Community Service
 Audrey F. Manley (1997) (the first alumna president of Spelman), under whom Spelman gained a Phi Beta Kappa chapter, Spelman was accepted as a provisional member of NCAA Division III athletics, and a Science Center was finished
 Beverly Daniel Tatum, (2002) under whom renovation of Sisters Chapel began and the state-of-the-art Wellness Center was finished
 Mary Schmidt Campbell, (2015) under whom Spelman began its largest comprehensive campaign in the institution's history setting a fundraising goal of $250 million. Also, Spelman's 84,000-square-foot Center for Innovation & the Arts is named in honor of Dr. Campbell
Helene Gayle, (2022) is a leading epidemiologist with over 20 years of experience with the Center for Disease Control. She served as president and CEO of The Chicago Community Trust, one of the nation's oldest and largest community foundations. She also served as president and CEO of Atlanta-based CARE, one of the largest international humanitarian organizations

Museum of Fine Art 

The Spelman College Museum of Fine Art is the only museum in the United States that emphasizes art by and about women of the African Diaspora. Some Black Women artists the museum has featured include Amy Sherald, Mickalene Thomas, and Reneé Stout.  Each semester, the museum features a new exhibit; past exhibits have included artists Beverly Buchanan (2017)<ref>"Spelman College; Spelman College Museum of Fine Art Launches its 2017 Season with a Solo Exhibition Featuring Acclaimed Artist Beverly Buchanan." Health & Medicine Week, Sep 29, 2017, pp. 5897. .</ref> and Zanele Muholi.

In 2016, the museum collaborated with Spelman's Department of Art and Art History to start a two-year curatorial studies program to increase diversity in the museum industry.

 Academics 

Spelman is ranked tied for 54th best among national liberal arts colleges and 1st among historically black colleges in the United States by U.S. News & World Report for 2021; additionally, it ranked Spelman 4th in "Social Mobility", 5th "Most Innovative", tied for 19th "Best Undergraduate Teaching", and 100th for "Best Value" among liberal arts colleges. Spelman leads the nation in enrolling the highest percentage of Gates Millennium Scholars. Spelman ranked first among baccalaureate origin institutions of African-American women who earned science, engineering, and mathematics doctoral degrees. Spelman ranked among the top 50 four-year colleges and universities for producing Fulbright and Gilman Scholars, and ranked the second-largest producer of African-American college graduates who attend medical school.  The Princeton Review ranked Spelman among the Best 373 Colleges and Universities in America in 2017.

Spelman is accredited by the Commission on Colleges of the Southern Association of Colleges and Schools (SACS). Spelman is a member of the Coalition of Women's Colleges, National Association of Schools of Music (NASM), National Council for the Accreditation of Teacher Education (NCATE), Southern Association of Colleges and Schools, The College Fund/UNCF, National Association for College Admissions Counseling, and State of Georgia Professional Standards Commission (PSC).

Spelman offers bachelor's degrees in over 30 academic majors. In addition, Spelman has strategic partnerships with over 30 accredited universities to help students more efficiently complete degree programs not offered on campus in healthcare, law, and engineering. Its most popular majors, by number out of 483 graduates in 2022, were:
Psychology (70)
Biology/Biological Sciences (69)
Political Science and Government (50)
Health Services/Allied Health/Health Sciences (44)
Economics (42)
English Language and Literature (35)

The Ethel Waddell Githii Honors Program is a selective academic community available to students who meet the highly rigorous requirements.

Spelman houses several pre-professional and research programs primarily designed to make students more competitive for admissions into reputable graduate school programs. Approximately two-thirds of Spelman graduates have earned postgraduate degrees.

Spelman has well-established domestic exchange and study abroad programs.

Spelman has the highest graduation rate among HBCUs, with a graduation rate of 76% after six years. It also has a student:faculty ratio of 9:1.

 Honor societies 
Registered academic honor societies include Phi Beta Kappa, Alpha Epsilon Delta, Alpha Lambda Delta, Alpha Sigma Lambda, Beta Kappa Chi, Golden Key International Honour Society, Kappa Delta Epsilon, Mortar Board Senior Honor Society, National Society of Collegiate Scholars, Pi Sigma Alpha, Psi Chi, Sigma Tau Delta, and the Upsilon Pi Epsilon.

 Admissions 
Spelman is a selective institution with an acceptance rate of 28% for the fall 2022 first-time, first-year class.  Spelman evaluates all applicants holistically which includes vetting their community service involvement, recommendation letters, personal statement, extracurricular activities, academic transcripts, and standardized test scores.

 Student body 
Students are all women and predominantly African-American. Approximately 30% come from Georgia, 69% from the rest of the United States, and 1% are international. 85% of Spelman students receive financial aid, the average financial package for a first year student adds up to $22,000.

 Student life 
Spelman offers organized and informal activities. Spelman's over 80 student organizations include community service organizations, special interest groups, honors societies, Morehouse cheerleaders, choral groups, music ensembles, dance groups, drama/theater groups, marching band, intramural sports, and student government.

Spelman's gated campus near downtown Atlanta consists of over 25 buildings on 39 acres.

 New Student Orientation 
All new Spelman students are required to attend a six-day new student orientation (NSO) in August immediately before the fall semester begins. The orientation includes events, workshops, and sessions designed to teach new Spelmanites about the mission, history, culture, traditions, and sisterhood of Spelman College; students are also given information on how to successfully matriculate to Spelman Women (graduates), such as registration, advisement, placement, and planning class schedules. Orientation is led by student orientation leaders known as PALs (Peer Assistant Leaders) and Spelman alumnae. During orientation, new students are required to remain on campus at all times; any leave must be approved by PALs.

 White attire tradition 
One of Spelman's oldest traditions are Spelmanites wearing "respectable and conservative" white attire to designated formal events on campus. The tradition began in the early 1900s when it was customary for women to wear white dresses when attending formal events. White attire is worn to the annual NSO induction ceremony, Founders Day Convocation, Alumnae March, and graduating seniors wear white attire underneath their graduation gowns for Class Day and Commencement.

 Student publications and media 

Spelman offers a literary magazine (Aunt Chloe: A Journal of Candor), a student newspaper, The BluePrint, and student government association newsletter (Jaguar Print).  The yearbook is called Reflections.

 Religious organizations 
Religious organizations currently registered on campus include: Baha'i Club, Al-Nissa, Alabaster Box, Atlanta Adventist Collegiate Society, Campus Crusade for Christ, Crossfire International Campus Ministry, Happiness In Praise for His Overflowing Presence, InterVarsity Christian Fellowship, Movements of Praise Dance Team, The Newman Organization, The Outlet and The Pre-Theology Society Minority.

 International student and social organizations 
NAACP and Sister Steps are registered campus organizations.  Spelman also has chapters of Colleges Against Cancer, Circle K, Feminist Majority Leadership Alliance, Habitat for Humanity, National Council of Negro Women, National Society of Black Engineers, Operation Smile, United Way, and Young Democrats of America. Spelman is also the first HBCU to charter a chapter of Amnesty International on its campus.

Spelman has four chapters of National Pan-Hellenic Council sororities on campus: the Mu Pi Chapter of Alpha Kappa Alpha, the Eta Kappa Chapter of Delta Sigma Theta, the Beta Iota Chapter of Zeta Phi Beta, and the Epsilon Eta Chapter of Sigma Gamma Rho.  Additionally, Spelman has the Iota Rho Chapter of Tau Beta Sigma National Honorary Band Sorority and the Eta Zeta Chapter of Gamma Sigma Sigma, a national service sorority.  About three percent of students are active in Spelman's Greek system.

 Residential life 
Spelman College has 11 residence halls on campus with approximately 1,500 students occupying them. Each one has unique features and identities. There are three first-year students only residence halls, an honors residence hall (mixed with first-year students and upperclasswomen), and seven upperclasswomen-only residence halls. All first-year students and sophomores are required to live on campus and it is traditional for first-year students to engage in friendly residence hall competitions (i.e. stroll-offs, chant-offs, pranks, fundraising, etc.) throughout the school year.

 Athletics 
Spelman athletic teams were the Jaguars. The college was a member of the Division III level of the National Collegiate Athletic Association (NCAA), primarily competing in the Great South Athletic Conference (GSAC) from 2003–04 to 2012–13.

Spelmen competed in seven intercollegiate varsity sports: Women's sports included basketball, cross country, golf, soccer, softball, tennis and volleyball.

In 2013, Spelman College decided to drop varsity athletics and leave the NCAA. Using money originally budgeted to the sports programs, they created wellness programs available for all students.

 Notable alumnae and faculty 
. 

Spelman's notable alumnae include the first African-American CEO of Sam's Club and Walgreens Rosalind Brewer, Pulitzer Prize winner Alice Walker, former Dean of Harvard College Evelynn M. Hammonds, activist and Children's Defense Fund founder Marian Wright Edelman, civil rights and criminal defense lawyer Dovey Johnson Roundtree, college organist Joyce Johnson, musician, activist and historian Bernice Johnson Reagon, politician Stacey Abrams, writer Pearl Cleage, TV personality Rolonda Watts, opera singer Mattiwilda Dobbs, and actresses Cassi Davis, LaTanya Richardson, Adrienne-Joi Johnson, Keshia Knight Pulliam, Tati Gabrielle , Assemblywoman of the 18th district of New York State  Taylor Darling, and designor and curator Sara Penn,  Lisa D. Cook, member of the Federal Reserve Board of Governors.

 See also 
 Women's colleges in the Southern United States

 References 

 Further reading 
 Atlanta Regional Council for Higher Education. "Giving Voice to a New Generation: Metro Atlanta's three women's colleges are going strong, even while the number of women's colleges nationwide has declined."
 Guy-Sheftall, Beverly. "Black Women and Higher Education: Spelman and Bennett Colleges Revisited." The Journal of Negro Education, Vol. 51, No. 3, The Impact of Black Women in Education: An Historical Overview (Summer, 1982), pp. 278–287.
 Johnetta Cross-Brazzell, "Brick without Straw: Missionary-Sponsored Black Higher Education in the Post-Emancipation Era," Journal of Higher Education 63 (January/February 1992).
 Beverly Guy-Sheftall and Jo Moore Stewart, Spelman: A Centennial Celebration, 1881–1981 (Atlanta: Spelman College, 1981).
 Albert E. Manley, A Legacy Continues: The Manley Years at Spelman College, 1953–1976 (Lanham, Md.: University Press of America, 1995).
 Florence M. Read, The Story of Spelman College'' (Princeton, N.J.: Princeton University Press, 1961).
 Spelman College Aiming for New Heights – Atlanta Journal-Constitution article
 The New Georgia Encyclopedia

External links 

 

 
1881 establishments in Georgia (U.S. state)
Educational institutions established in 1881
Historically black universities and colleges in the United States
Institutions founded by the Rockefeller family
Liberal arts colleges in Georgia (U.S. state)
Universities and colleges accredited by the Southern Association of Colleges and Schools
Universities and colleges in Atlanta
Women's universities and colleges in the United States
Private universities and colleges in Georgia (U.S. state)